Crosby Hall may refer to:

 Crosby Hall, London, a Grade II* listed building in Cheyne Walk, Chelsea, London, England
 Crosby Hall, Liverpool, an ancient building near Liverpool, England

Architectural disambiguation pages